"No Man's Land" is a song by American singer-songwriter Billy Joel. It was released as the second single from his 1993 album River of Dreams. The song is about the growth of suburbia and its negative environmental and social aspects. It was performed by Joel on the premiere episode of Late Show with David Letterman on August 30, 1993. The song peaked at number 18 on the US Billboard Album Rock Tracks chart.

In 2017, Joel performed the song in concert as part of the story line in the Thanksgiving episode of the sixth season of the TV series Arrow. In 2018, he recalled the song as containing his best lyrics, with "biblical imagery skewed by consumerism". On the 1994 River of Dreams Tour, Joel often opened concerts with "No Man's Land".

Track listings
All songs were written by Billy Joel.

UK CD single
 "No Man's Land" (LP version) – 4:45
 "No Man's Land" (live) – 5:03

Charts

References

1992 songs
1993 singles
Billy Joel songs
Columbia Records singles
Song recordings produced by Danny Kortchmar
Songs written by Billy Joel